Calothyrza jardinei is a species of beetle in the family Cerambycidae. It was described by White in 1858. It is known from Tanzania, South Africa, Zambia and the Democratic Republic of the Congo.

References

Phrynetini
Beetles described in 1858